Claus Schiprowski (born 27 December 1942 in Gelsenkirchen) is a West German Olympic silver medalist who competed mainly in the pole vault.

He won his silver medal at the Mexico City 1968 Summer Olympics in the pole vault event.

References

External links 
 Leverkusen who's who
 

1942 births
Living people
Sportspeople from Gelsenkirchen
German male pole vaulters
West German pole vaulters
Olympic silver medalists for West Germany
Athletes (track and field) at the 1968 Summer Olympics
Olympic athletes of West Germany
Medalists at the 1968 Summer Olympics
Olympic silver medalists in athletics (track and field)